Wolanski is a surname. Notable people with the surname include:

Janusz Wolański (born 1979), Polish footballer
Patryk Wolański (born 1991), Polish footballer
Sabina Wolanski (1927–2011), Ukraine-born Polish author

See also
Polanski (surname)
Wolinski